The Diocese of Bridgeport is a Latin Church ecclesiastical jurisdiction or diocese of the Catholic Church located in the southwestern part of the state of Connecticut in the United States.  It is a suffragan diocese in the ecclesiastical province of the metropolitan Archdiocese of Hartford.

The Diocese of Bridgeport includes all of Fairfield County, Connecticut and has 82 parishes. Its cathedral is St. Augustine Cathedral in Bridgeport. As of 2023, the diocese is led by Bishop Frank Caggiano.

Description
The Diocese of Bridgeport is one of 195 dioceses in the United States. It is one of four dioceses in the Ecclesiastical Province of Hartford—the others are the Archdiocese of Hartford, the Diocese of Norwich and the Diocese of Providence.

The largest church in the Diocese of Bridgeport is St. Mary's Church in Stamford, built in 1928. Sacred Heart Parish in Georgetown was the home parish for American writers Flannery O'Connor and Robert Fitzgerald from 1949 to 1952 when O'Connor was living in Ridgefield as a boarder with the Fitzgeralds. ("The working day as we set it up that fall began with early mass in Georgetown, four miles away," Fitzgerald wrote.)

Demographics
As of  2006, the Diocese of Bridgeport had over 410,304 registered Catholics, 44 percent of the total county population.

Other statistics from 2006:
Baptisms: 4,343
First Communions: 4,907
Marriages: 981
Funerals: 3,334

Leadership figures from 2011:
Diocesan priests: 240
Permanent deacons: 103
Religious sisters: 330
Seminarians for priesthood: 35
Priests ordained in 2011: one

Languages
While all the diocesan parishes offer mass in English, other languages are offered depending on the needs of a particular congregation. These include Brazilian, Creole, French, Igbo/Nigerian, Italian, Korean, Polish, Portuguese, Lithuanian, Spanish, and Vietnamese.

Several parishes also offer the Traditional Latin mass, particularly Sts. Cyril and Methodius Parish in Bridgeport, which offers mass in no other language.

History

The Catholic Church in Fairfield County, in Connecticut and in America faced ongoing challenges through much of its history as diverse immigrant groups struggled to acclimate themselves to American culture. Another early challenge came from deep suspicions among many (although not all) Protestants.

Seventeenth and eighteenth centuries
In the 17th and much of the 18th centuries, Puritan ministers in the British Province of Connecticut were vociferously anti-Catholic in their writings and preaching. They considered the Catholic Church to be a foreign political power, with Catholics only having loyalty to the Vatican."In the summer of 1781, French Marshal Jean-Baptiste Rochambeau and his army marched through Connecticut, encamping in the Ridgebury section of Ridgefield, where the first Catholic mass [in Fairfield County] was offered. His troops were mostly Catholic and were ministered to by Reverend Fathers Robin, Gluson, Lacy, and Saint Pierre."  After the American Revolution, between 1780 to 1781 in Lebanon, Connecticut, the first Catholic "Mass was first celebrated, continuously and for a long period, within the limits of the State of Connecticut."  On June 26, 1881, St. Peter's Parish in Hartford celebrated the centenary of that first mass.

The Connecticut General Assembly passed an act of toleration in 1784, allowing any Protestant to avoid paying taxes to support the local Congregational Church, provided that they could prove membership and regular attendance at another Protestant church. In 1791, the Assembly granted the same right to all Christians, including Catholics. However, the act had little practical effect for Catholics as there were no parishes then in the state.

Nineteenth century
The first Catholic church in Connecticut was established in 1829 in Hartford. In 1830, Reverend James Fitton celebrated mass in Bridgeport in the home of James McCullough on Middle Street. From 1832 to 1837, Reverend James McDermot visited Hartford from New Haven. He said mass at the Farrell residence, also on Middle Street. By 1835, the rector of the New Haven church estimated there were 720 Catholics in Fairfield County, with Bridgeport home of the biggest community—about 100 people. McDermot was followed by Reverend James Smyth, also from New Haven.

On July 24, 1842, St. James the Apostle Church (Irish) was dedicated by Bishop Benedict Fenwick of the Diocese of Boston in Bridgeport.  The town then had a population of about 250 Catholics. The church rector was given responsibility for small Catholic communities in Derby and Norwalk. Catholics in Stamford, Greenwich and other towns were ministered to by the Bridgeport rector and by Jesuit priests based at Fordham College in New York City. In 1844, Reverend Michael Lynch, a former pastor in Waltham, Massachusetts, became the first resident priest in Bridgeport. His responsibilities included missions in Norwalk, Stamford, Danbury, Wolcottville, and Norfolk.

Reverend Thomas Synnott, pastor of St. James Parish, established St. Mary's Parish (Irish) in East Bridgeport in 1854.  He then opened St. Augustine (Irish) Parish in Bridgeport in 1869. Sacred Heart Parish (Irish) was organized in 1883; until the church was ready for services, mass was held at the Opera House. In 1890, Reverend James Nihil purchased the Eli Thompson estate; the Board of Education allowed the use of the Grand Street School until St. Patrick's Church was ready for services. St. Michael's "Chapel of Ease" (funded and administered by Sacred Heart Parish) was constructed in Bridgeport in 1895; the Sisters of Mercy operated a school in the rear portion of the building. A number of ethnic parishes were also established: 

 St. Joseph's (German) 
 St. Anthony of Padua (French) 
 St. Stephen's (Hungarian) 
 St. John Nepomucene (Slovak) in 1891, the first Slovak church in New England

On November 28, 1843, Pope Leo XIII split the Diocese of Hartford off from the Diocese of Boston, which had previously covered all of New England. The new diocese consisted of all of Connecticut and Rhode Island.  The Bridgeport area would remain part of the Diocese of Hartford for the next 110 years..

Twentieth century

Pope Pius XII erected the Diocese of Bridgeport on August 6, 1953, removing its territory from the Diocese of Hartford. The pope named Auxiliary Bishop Lawrence Shehan of the Archdiocese of Baltimore as the first bishop of Bridgeport.

During his tenure in Bridgeport, Shehan established 18 new parishes, built 24 new churches, and founded three high schools. He also formed a Catholic Youth Organization, promoted vocations to the priesthood and religious life, and began parish ministry for the increasing number of Hispanic, Portuguese, and Brazilian immigrants. In October 1960, Shehan convoked the first synod of Bridgeport to complete the initial organization of the diocese and to establish a uniform code of practice and discipline for the clergy. Shehan was named archbishop of the Archdiocese of Baltimore by Pope John XXIII in 1961.

John XXIII named Auxiliary Bishop Walter Curtis of the Archdiocese of Newark as the next bishop of Bridgeport in 1961. As bishop, Curtis established the following schools in the diocese:

 Notre Dame Girls' High School in Fairfield
 Kolbe Cathedral High School in Bridgeport
 Notre Dame Boys' High School in Fairfield
 St. Joseph High School in Trumbull
 Immaculate High School in Danbury
 Sacred Heart University at Fairfield in 1963

Curtis spent most of his administration implementing the reforms of the Second Vatican Council. During the 1970's, he oversaw the renovation of St. Augustine Cathedral and its re-dedication in 1979. He established two nursing homes: Pope John Paul II Health Care Center in Danbury and St. Camillus Health Care Center in Stamford The Catholic population in the diocese increased from 286,000 to 300,000. He also founded the Fairfield Foundation, a nondenominational group that helps people in need in the county. Curtis retired in 1988.

Pope John Paul II named Auxiliary Bishop Edward Egan of the Archdiocese of New York as the next bishop of Bridgeport in 1988. During his tenure, Egan oversaw the reorganization of Catholic schools. He also raised $45 million for diocesan schools through a fundraising campaign, "Faith in the Future." The diocesan Catholic Charities under his tenure, became the largest private social service agency in the county. To support the 12 Hispanic parishes in the diocese, he brought Spanish-speaking priests to Bridgeport from Colombia. Egan also established a home for retired priests and a school for children with special needs.

Twenty first century 
After John Paul II named Egan as archbishop of New York, the pope appointed Auxiliary Bishop William E. Lori from the Archdiocese of Washington as the new bishop of Bridgeport.  While serving in Bridgeport, Lori refused to release the names of diocesan priests who were being sued for sexual abuse of minors. The US Supreme Court ruled against Lori in 2009 and the diocese was forced to release the names. Pope Benedict XVI named Lori as archbishop of the Archdiocese of Baltimore in 2012.

The current bishop of the Diocese of Bridgeport is Frank Caggiano, formerly an auxiliary bishop of the Diocese of Brooklyn.  He was appointed by Benedict XVI in 2012.  One of Caggiano's first actions as bishop was to publicly announce the financial deficit incurred before his installation, and to mandate that pastors serve six-year renewable periods at parishes and would be required to submit their resignations when they turned 75, much like bishops did.

In 2014, Caggiano convoked the 4th Synod of the Diocese of Bridgeport, the first in 32 years (themed "Building Bridges to the Future Together"). In an interview with America Magazine, Caggiano said that one of his first priorities as bishop is reaching out to the high percentage of Catholics in the diocese, who for whatever reasons, no longer attend mass. One of the major concerns that the synod focused on was the decline in mass attendance and sacramental reception as well as the need to bolster Catholic schools due to declining enrollment.In 2018, Caggiano announced that liturgical norms and regulations in the diocese would be revised over the next four-year period as a result of discussions from the diocesan synod. Caggiano said on October 1, 2018, that these newer regulations would "allow us to pray effectively and reverently as a Church" and would be the newest norms implemented since 1983.

Reports of sex abuse

In 1993, 23 lawsuits were filed against the Diocese of Bridgeport, alleging sexual abuse by priests. The 23 claims were settled in 2001. Five priests were evicted from the ministry. Two diocesan priests, Kieran Ahearn and John Castaldo, were convicted on sex abuse charges respectively in 1993 and 2001. However, many other accused priests died without facing trial. In November 2014, the diocese revealed a list of accused clergy. In 2016, Bishop Caggiano removed accused priest John Stronkowski from active ministry in the diocese. In October 2018, the diocese released a report of financial settlements with abuse victims. The majority of the cost of settlements (approximately 92%) was provided through the sale of diocesan property, insurance recoveries and other co-defendants. The diocese paid approximately $52.5 million to settle 156 abuse cases dating back to 1953. In March 2019, ten additional names were later added to the original 2014 list.

In October 2019, former Connecticut Superior Court Judge Robert Holzberg released the results of his investigation, commissioned by  Bishop Caggiano, into the diocese's handling of accusations of sexual abuse by its priests. Holzberg found that Bishops Shehan, Curtis and Egan had consistently failed to fulfill their moral and legal responsibilities. Holzberg found that Egan took a "dismissive, uncaring, and at times threatening attitude toward survivors"; he characterized Egan's behavior as "profoundly unsympathetic, inadequate, and inflammatory". Holzberg's report, which stemmed from a year-long investigation, accused 71 priests of sexually abusing 300 children since 1953. However, the report praised the reforms made by Bishops Lori and Caggiano to combat sex abuse; Holzberg compared their tenures to that of their three predecessors as "a tale of two cities."

On January 3, 2020, accused Danbury priest Jaime Marin-Cordona was arrested and released on bond four weeks later after agreeing to wear a tracking device. He was charged with three counts of fourth-degree sexual assault, three counts of risk of injury to child and three counts of illegal sexual contact. He pled not guilty to all nine charges. In March 2020, it was announced that the pre-trial hearing for Marin-Cardona would begin March 27, 2020 and conclude April 21, 2020. Marin-Cardona was charged with three counts of fourth-degree sexual assault, three counts of risk of injury to child and three counts of illegal sexual contact. In 2022, he was convicted of sexual assault and sentenced to one year in state prison.

Bishops

Bishops of Bridgeport
 Lawrence Shehan (1953–1961), appointed Coadjutor Archbishop of Baltimore and subsequently succeeded to that see, created cardinal in 1965
 Walter William Curtis (1961–1988)
 Edward Egan (1988–2000), appointed Archbishop of New York and subsequently created cardinal in 2001
 William E. Lori (2001–2012), appointed Archbishop of Baltimore
 Frank J. Caggiano (2013–present)

Education

Primary and secondary level
The Diocese of Bridgeport sponsors 32 regional elementary schools (with 9,974 students) including All Saints Catholic School in Norwalk and five diocesan high schools (with 2,627 students). Two other Catholic high schools are directed by religious communities. Altogether, these schools educate nearly 14,000 youth (2,500 of whom are minorities and 1,700 are non-Catholics).

High schools
 Convent of the Sacred Heart*, Greenwich
 Fairfield College Preparatory School*, Fairfield
 Immaculate High School, Danbury
 Kolbe Cathedral High School, Bridgeport
 Notre Dame Catholic High School, Fairfield
 St. Joseph High School, Trumbull
 Trinity Catholic High School, Stamford
 *Independently operated with approval of the diocese

Higher education
These three Roman Catholic schools in the diocese have more than 11,000 students:
Fairfield University
Sacred Heart University
St. Vincent's College in Bridgeport

Social services

For the elderly
The Diocese of Bridgeport sponsors nursing homes in Danbury, Stamford, and Trumbull; and eight "Bishop Curtis Homes" for the elderly in Bethel, Danbury, Greenwich, Stamford, Fairfield, and Bridgeport.

Other
"Catholic Charities of Fairfield County, with 25 program offices throughout the county, provides the largest private network of social services in southwestern Connecticut," according to the diocese.

See also

 Catholic Church by country
 Catholic Church in the United States
 Ecclesiastical Province of Hartford
 Global organisation of the Catholic Church
 List of Roman Catholic archdioceses (by country and continent)
 List of Roman Catholic dioceses (alphabetical) (including archdioceses)
 List of Roman Catholic dioceses (structured view) (including archdioceses)
 List of the Catholic dioceses of the United States

References

External links
Diocesan website
Fairfield County Catholic , the official diocesan newspaper
St. John Fisher Seminary, the diocese seminary

 
Diocese of Bridgeport
Fairfield County, Connecticut
Christian organizations established in 1953
Bridgeport
Bridgeport